"Loaded" is a single released by the Scottish band Deacon Blue in 1987.

The main B-side, "Long Distance from Just Across the Road", appears on all versions of the single, which was released on Cassette and on 7" and 12" vinyl.  Ricky Ross has described this stark, echoing song as "[a]n attempt to re-write 'Shore Leave' by Tom Waits." The other songs, "Which Side Are You On" and "Kings of the Western World", appear on the Cassette and 12" versions of the single.

In an interview given to the Daily Record in 2012, songwriter Ricky Ross explained about "Loaded" that "I’d left the keys to my flat in Glasgow to the guys in the band and they did a backing track on an old 8 track. I came in and started singing stream of consciousness on it, about some of the people we’d met in the record business. Part of the lyric was lifted from an old evangelical children's hymn, "Christ Is The Answer"".

Track listing
All songs written by Ricky Ross, except where noted:

References

Deacon Blue songs
1987 singles
Songs written by Ricky Ross (musician)